Plesioplatecarpus is an extinct genus of plioplatecarpine mosasaur known from the Late Cretaceous (middle Coniacian to middle Santonian stage) of the northern Gulf of Mexico and the Western Interior Basin of North America.

History

Plesioplatecarpus was originally named by Cope in 1874 as Clidastes planifrons, and later it was reassigned to Platecarpus. The name Plesioplatecarpus was erected by Takuya Konishi and Michael W. Caldwell in 2011 to incorporate Platecarpus planifrons, which was found to be distinct from Platecarpus in a phylogenetic analysis. It is known from the holotype AMNH 1491, a nearly complete skeleton. Many other specimens are also referred to this species, including FHSM VP2116 and 2296, UALVP 24240 and 40402 and YPM 40508.

References

Fossil taxa described in 2011
Russellosaurins
Mosasaurs of North America
Coniacian genus first appearances
Santonian genus extinctions